NGC 3048 is a pair of spiral galaxies located in the constellation Leo. It was discovered on April 27, 1864, by German astronomer Albert Marth. The object consists of a visual pair of galaxies, PGC 1509261 and PGC 28595. PGC 1509261 is likely a physical pair with a much fainter galactic object not a part of the New General Catalogue, J095458+162726.

See also
 List of NGC objects (3001–4000)

References 

Spiral galaxies
Leo (constellation)
3048
Astronomical objects discovered in 1864
028595